OneBeat is an annual music exchange program that brings together musicians from around the world to share and collaborate on musical ideas and projects. OneBeat is the result of a partnership between Found Sound Nation, Bang on a Can and the US Department of State's Bureau of Educational and Cultural Affairs. The first program was held in 2012 and as a release states:

The program selects around 25 musicians from hundreds of international applicants to participate in a two-week Artist-in-residence/residency, where they experiment with sounds, records and produce tracks, and implement workshops through brainstorming with local educators, organizers and entrepreneurs. These compositions and workshops are taken on the road for a two-week-long tour of performances, youth workshops and public music making.

References

External links
OneBeat website

Bureau of Educational and Cultural Affairs